Sri Aurobindo International School is a higher-secondary co-education private school in the Patiala city of Punjab, India. The school was founded in 1984 and is affiliated to the Central Board of Secondary Education of India.

References 

Co-educational schools in India
International schools in India
High schools and secondary schools in Patiala
Educational institutions established in 1984
1984 establishments in Punjab, India
Schools affiliated with the Sri Aurobindo Ashram